Tentax ferax is a moth of the family Erebidae first described by Michael Fibiger in 2011. It is found in southern Thailand (it was described from Phang Nga).

The wingspan is about 9.5 mm. The forewings are beige brown, although the terminal area and fringes are brown. There is a black-brown quadrangular patch at the upper medial area. The costa is basally black brown, subapically with small black dots. The crosslines are indistinct and light brown, except for well-marked brown subterminal line and terminal line indicated by black-brown interveinal dots. The hindwings are grey with an indistinct discal spot. The underside of the forewings is unicolorous brown and the underside of the hindwings is grey with a discal spot.

References

Micronoctuini
Taxa named by Michael Fibiger
Moths described in 2011